Carl Tanner is an operatic tenor.

Carl or Karl Tanner may also refer to:

Carl Tanner, character in The Alphabet Killer
Karl Tanner, character in Celia (film)
Karl Tanner, character in season three in the television series Game of Thrones